Andrew Mitchell (born 1980 in Clonkill, County Westmeath, Ireland) is an Irish sportsperson.  He plays hurling with his local club Clonkill and has been a member of the Westmeath senior inter-county team since 2000.

References

Teams

1980 births
Living people
Clonkill hurlers
Westmeath inter-county hurlers